Pelexia is a genus of flowering plants from the orchid family, Orchidaceae. It has about 60-70 accepted species, native to Latin America, the West Indies and Florida.

See also 
 List of Orchidaceae genera

References 

 Berg Pana, H. 2005. Handbuch der Orchideen-Namen. Dictionary of Orchid Names. Dizionario dei nomi delle orchidee. Ulmer, Stuttgart

External links 

Cranichideae genera
Spiranthinae